Gilham is a surname. Notable people with the surname include:

Cherri Gilham (born 1944), British comedy actress
George Gilham (1899–1937), American baseball player
Mark Gilham (born 1957), British punk guitarist and songwriter
Stephen Gilham (born 1984), Australian rules football player
Tony Gilham (born 1979), British auto racing driver
William Gilham (1818–1872), American soldier, teacher, chemist, and author
Emma Gilham Page (1855–1933), daughter of William Gilham and wife of William N. Page

See also
Tony Gilham Racing, a British motor racing team
Clarence C. Gilhams (1860–1912), American politician from Indiana
Gilhams Lake, a lake on Willeo Creek in Atlanta, Georgia, United States